Calberlah is a municipality in the district of Gifhorn, in Lower Saxony, Germany. The Municipality Calberlah includes the villages of Allenbüttel, Allerbüttel, Brunsbüttel, Calberlah, Edesbüttel, Jelpke and Wettmershagen.

References 

Gifhorn (district)